The Montenegrin Regional Cups are the lower football competitions in which are participating members of Montenegrin Third League. There are three regional cups - Northern, Central and Southern (Montenegrin: Kup Sjeverne regije; Kup Srednje regije; Kup Južne regije). Finalists of every regional cup are qualifying for Montenegrin Cup.

History
After the independence of Montenegro, Football Association of Montenegro founded Montenegrin Cup as a national cup competition. All the members of Montenegrin First League and Montenegrin Second League are directly qualifying for playing in Montenegrin Cup. Members of Montenegrin Third League are playing in Regional Cups, and six best clubs are qualifying for Montenegrin Cup's round one.

Since its establishing, Regional Cup is divided on three divisions - Northern, Southern and Central. Finalists of every division are playing in Montenegrin Cup.
Regional Cups are playing during the summer (August/September), just before the start of Montenegrin Cup season.

Winners and finalists

Only teams from Third League (lower-rank in Montenegro) are playing in Regional Cups. Below is the list of winners and finalists by every single division.

Northern Region Cup
Since 2006, in the Northern Region Cup (Kup Sjeverne regije) are participying clubs from Third Montenegrin League - North. Every season, winner and runner-up of Regional Cup are qualified for Montenegrin Cup.

Central Region Cup
Since 2006, in the Central Region Cup (Kup Srednje regije) are participying clubs from Third Montenegrin League - Central. Every season, winner and runner-up of Regional Cup are qualified for Montenegrin Cup.

Southern Region Cup
Since 2006, in the Southern Region Cup (Kup Južne regije) are participying clubs from Third Montenegrin League - South. Every season, winner and runner-up of Regional Cup are qualified for Montenegrin Cup.

Sources:

See also
Montenegrin Cup
Montenegrin Third League
Football in Montenegro
Montenegrin Republic Cup (1947-2006)

External links
Football Association of Montenegro - Official Site
Football Association of the Central Region of Montenegro - Official Site
Football Association of the Southern Region of Montenegro - Official Site
Football Association of the Northern Region of Montenegro - Official Site

References

R
Cup
Recurring sporting events established in 2006
2006 establishments in Montenegro